The Likely Lads is a British sitcom created and written by Dick Clement and Ian La Frenais and produced by Dick Clement. Twenty episodes were broadcast by the BBC, in three series, between 16 December 1964 and 23 July 1966. However, only ten of these episodes have survived.

This show was followed by a sequel series, in colour, entitled Whatever Happened to the Likely Lads?, broadcast between 9 January 1973 and 24 December 1974. This was followed in 1976 by a spin-off feature film The Likely Lads.

Some episodes of both the original black and white series and the colour sequel were adapted for BBC radio with the original television cast.

Premise
The original show followed the friendship of two young working class men, Terry Collier (James Bolam) and Bob Ferris (Rodney Bewes), in the mid-1960s. Bob and Terry are assumed to be in their early 20s (when their ages are revealed in the later film, this puts both characters at around 20 when the series started).

After growing up at school and in the Scouts together, Bob and Terry are working in the same factory, Ellison's Electrical, alongside the older, wiser duo of Cloughie and Jack. The show's humour derived largely from the tensions between Terry's cynical, everyman, working class personality and Bob's ambition to better himself and move to the middle class.

Bob and Terry were two average working class lads growing up in the industrial North East, whose hobbies were beer, football and girls. They were street-wise, yet they stumbled into one scrape after another as they struggled to enjoy the Swinging Sixties on their meagre incomes.

At the end of the third and final series in 1966, a depressed and bored Bob attempted to join the Army but was rejected because of his flat feet. Terry, who decided at the last minute to enlist to keep Bob company, was accepted and shipped away for three years.

It was gradually revealed that Terry and Bob's full names were Terence Daniel Collier and Robert Andrew Scarborough Ferris (Scarborough not revealed until the 1970s colour series). According to the later feature film, made in 1976, both Lads were conceived during the same wartime air raid and were thus born in the same year, 1944.

Although in the colour sequel much was made of Thelma, who was said to have been Bob's childhood sweetheart, she appeared only once in the original show, in which Bob had no steady girlfriend and was forever seeking one, though she was mentioned in some episodes in series three, including "Rocker" and "Goodbye to All That".

Etymology

The word "likely" in the show's title is ambiguous. In some dialects in Northern England it means "likeable" but it may be derived from the phrase the man most likely to (i.e. likely to succeed, having potential), a boxing expression in common use on Tyneside, hence, in Geordie slang, "a likely lad". Another possible meaning is the ambiguous Northern usage of "likely" to mean a small-time troublemaker.

Cast
James Bolam as Terry Collier
Rodney Bewes as Bob Ferris
Brigit Forsyth as Thelma Chambers
Sheila Fearn as Audrey Collier, Terry's older sister
Bartlett Mullins as Cloughie, a workmate
Don McKillop as Jack, another workmate
Olive Milbourne as Mrs Edith Collier, Terry and Audrey's mother
Alex McDonald as Mr Cyril Collier, Terry and Audrey's dad
Irene Richmond as Mrs Alice Ferris, Bob's mother
Richard Moore as Blakey

Guest stars included George Layton, Garfield Morgan, Wendy Richard, Wanda Ventham, Susan Jameson (the real-life wife of James Bolam), Michael Sheard, Nerys Hughes, Geoffrey Hughes, Helen Fraser and Tony Caunter.

Episodes
Only ten episodes survive (as film telerecordings) in the BBC's archives, as a result of its wiping policy of the time. However, the BBC Archive Treasure Hunt, a public campaign, continues to search for missing episodes. Of the ten remaining lost episodes, only 'The Razor's Edge' was not recorded as part of the radio adaptation series.

Series 1 (1964–65)

Series 2 (1965)

Series 3 (1966)

Surviving episodes

Lost episodes

Christmas Night with the Stars
Additionally, an eight-minute episode of The Likely Lads was broadcast on 25 December 1964, as part of a 90-minute Christmas Day special on BBC 1 called Christmas Night with the Stars 7:15 p.m. to 8:45 p.m., in which Bob and Terry have an argument over Bob's encyclopaedic knowledge of "Rupert the Bear" Annuals ("It was Edward Trunk!"). This recording still exists in the BBC Broadcast Archive. An edited version, which included 'The Likely Lads' sketch, was screened on BBC2 over Christmas 1991.

Radio adaptations
Sixteen of the television scripts were adapted for radio by James Bolam, and broadcast in two series during 1967 and 1968.

Produced by John Browell, the radio adaptations were recorded at the Paris Studios in Lower Regent Street, London using the original television cast (although some minor parts had to be recast for some episodes, where the original actor was unavailable).

Series 1

Series 2

DVD releases
In one DVD release, only seven of the eight (then) extant episodes were included, in spite of the cover stating that it contained all the surviving episodes. The eighth episode (Other Side of the Fence) was included on the Likely Lads and Whatever Happened to the Likely Lads? combined box set, as an 'extra' rather than in chronological order. The two episodes rediscovered in 2018 have been released, with the feature film made in 1976.

See also
List of films based on British sitcoms
The Liver Birds, a comparable comedy about two women living in Liverpool.

Sources
 A Likely Story: The Autobiography of Rodney Bewes, published by Century, 1 September 2005
 BBC Comedy Guide, The Likely Lads
 BBC Comedy Guide, Whatever Happened to The Likely Lads
 The Likely Lads on Tyne
 The Likely Lads IMDB entry
 Whatever Happened to The Likely Lads IMDB entry

References

External links

The Likely Lads Radio Series, 1967-68

Further reading
 
 
 Clement, Dick; La Frenais, Ian (1967). The Likely Lads. London: Rapp & Carroll Limited.

1964 British television series debuts
1966 British television series endings
1960s British sitcoms
BBC television sitcoms
Lost BBC episodes
Television shows set in Tyne and Wear
Television shows set in County Durham
Black-and-white British television shows
English-language television shows
1967 radio programme debuts
1968 radio programme endings